Ben or Benjamin Wright may refer to:

Ben
Ben Wright (American actor) (born 1969) and stuntman, "Jack" in the original Broadway production of Into the Woods (1987)
Ben Wright (bishop) (1942–2010), Australian Anglican bishop
Ben Wright (cricketer) (born 1987), English cricketer, currently playing for Glamorgan
Ben Wright (English actor) (1915–1989), British film and radio actor
Ben Wright (footballer, born 1980), English footballer
Ben Wright (footballer, born 1988), English footballer
Ben Wright (journalist), BBC political correspondent

Benjamin
Benjamin Wright (1770–1842), civil engineer
Benjamin Wright (composer), American producer and composer
Benjamin Angus Wright, British media composer
Benjamin D. Wright (1799–1874), Florida lawyer, journalist, and Whig politician
Benjamin Drake Wright (1926–2015), American psychometrician